Daniel Sinkinson is a New Zealand rugby union player who plays for the  in Super Rugby. His playing position is wing. He was named in the Hurricanes squad for the 2023 Super Rugby Pacific season. He was also a member of the  2022 Bunnings NPC squad.

References

External links
itsrugby.co.uk profile

New Zealand rugby union players
Living people
Rugby union wings
Waikato rugby union players
Hurricanes (rugby union) players
Year of birth missing (living people)